The 1967 Summer Universiade, also known as the V Summer Universiade, took place in Tokyo, Japan.

Eastern Bloc countries including Soviet Union, Romania, Hungary, Bulgaria, Poland, Cuba, Czechoslovakia and North Korea boycotted the Games due to the naming disputes about North Korea.

Sports at the 1967 Summer Universiade
 Athletics
 Basketball
 Diving
 Fencing
 Gymnastics
 Judo
 Swimming
 Tennis
 Volleyball
 Water polo

Medal table

References

 
Summer World University Games
U
Summer Universiade
U
Multi-sport events in Japan
Sports competitions in Tokyo
Summer Universiade
Summer Universiade
Summer Universiade